Tumen Dashtseveg is the head of the Department of Anthropology & Archaeology, National University of Mongolia, Ulaanbaatar, Mongolia.

Career
Tumen did her doctoral degree at Moscow State University in Anthropology. She specialises in paleoanthropology, human skeletal biology, paleodemography, paleopathology, racial variation and historical populations in Mongolia and North Asia.

Bibliography
Jack N. Fenner, Dashtseveg Tumen and Dorjpurev Khatanbaatar. 'Food fit for a Khan: stable isotope analysis of the elite Mongol Empire cemetery at Tavan Tolgoi, Mongolia,' Journal of Archaeological Science 46(2014): 231–244.
'Mongolian origins and cranio-morphometric variability,' in Pechenkina, K. and M. Oxenham, eds. Bioarchaeology of East Asia: movement, contact, health, pp. 85–109. Gainesville: University Press of Florida, 2013.

References

Living people
Mongolian women academics
Mongolian archaeologists
Moscow State University alumni
Year of birth missing (living people)